The North American jaguar is a jaguar (Panthera onca) population in North America, ranging from the Southwestern United States to Central America . They are most associated to Central and South America. This population has declined over decades and was almost extirpated from the United States by 1960. 

Results of morphologic and genetic research failed to find evidence for subspecific differentiation.

This population is also referred to as the "American jaguar" and "Central American jaguar".

Taxonomic history 

Initially, a number of jaguar subspecies were described:
 The taxonomic name Panthera onca goldmani (Mearns, 1901) was proposed as ranging from the Yucatán Peninsula in Mexico, in the north, to Belize and Honduras in the south.
 Panthera onca hernandesii (Mearns, 1901) was proposed as native to Mexico and the United States.
 Panthera onca veraecruscis (Nelson and Goldman, 1933) was proposed as ranging from Tabasco in Mexico to Texas in the United States.
 Panthera onca arizonensis (Goldman, 1932) was proposed with a range from Sonora in Mexico, to the southwestern part of United States, before 1939.
 Panthera onca centralis (Mearns, 1901) was proposed for Central America.

In 1939, Reginald Innes Pocock did not find evidence for morphological distinction between P. o. hernandesii, P. o. centralis and P. o. arizonensis and considered them one subspecies. Recent tests failed to establish evidence for different subspecies of the jaguar.

Evolution 
The modern jaguar is thought to have descended from a pantherine ancestor in Asia that crossed the Beringian land bridge into North America during the Early Pleistocene. From North America, it spread to Central and South America. The ancestral jaguar in North America is referred to as Panthera onca augusta. During the Pleistocene epoch, jaguars were much more wide-spread through out North America with their ranges extending to places like Nebraska, Washington, and Maryland due to various fossil specimens being unearthed over the course of many decades with the highest concentrations of fossil jaguars being unearthed in Florida and eastern Tennessee. The jaguar was much more common in Florida than its other felid relatives.

Characteristics 

Ecology and behavior 
In northeastern Mexico, jaguars co-occur with cougars. Both are foremost active at night and prey on white-tailed deer (Odocoileus virginianus), collared peccary (Dicotyles tajacu) and cattle calves (Bos taurus).

Other sympatric predators in the region include the American black bear (Ursus americanus) and formerly, the Mexican grizzly bear (Ursus arctos nelsoni) and Mexican wolf (Canis lupus baileyi). There is evidence that a jaguar nicknamed El Jefe, which lived the southwestern United States from 2011 to 2015, preyed on a young American black bear sow.

In July 2018, in the Central American section of the Audubon Zoo in the US city of New Orleans, Louisiana, a 3-year-old male called 'Valerio' escaped from its enclosure, which had a roof in poor condition. It killed four alpacas, an emu and a fox, and injured two other alpacas and a fox, before being captured about an hour after its escape was notified. The killings were apparently the result of a territorial dispute. Its behavior was not deemed to be abnormal for its species.

Habitat and distribution 

In North America, the jaguar currently ranges from the southern part of the United States in the north, to the southern part of Central America in the south. As recently as 2016, jaguars of Mexican origin have been spotted in Arizona. As below-mentioned, historical records distributed wider than today, reaching up to at least what is now Colorado and California, or to the Pacific Northwest in the west and Pennsylvania, Ohio and Florida in the east with much less credibility, corresponding to that of known records of the Pleistocene giant jaguar.

United States 
In 1799, Thomas Jefferson recorded the jaguar as an animal of the Americas. There are multiple verified zoological reports of jaguars in California, two as far north as Monterey in 1814 (Langsdorff) and 1826 (Beechey). The coastal Diegueño (Kumeyaay people) of San Diego and Cahuilla Indians of Palm Springs had words for jaguar and the cats persisted there until about 1860. The only recorded description of an active jaguar den with breeding adults and kittens in the United States was in the Tehachapi Mountains of California, prior to 1860. 

Cabot's 1544 map has a drawing of jaguars ranging over the Pennsylvania and Ohio valleys. Historically, the jaguar was also recorded in far eastern Texas, coastal Louisiana, and the northern parts of Arizona and New Mexico. However, since the 1940s, the jaguar has been limited to vagrants in southern areas of Arizona. Although less reliable than zoological records, Native American artefacts with possible jaguar motifs range from the Pacific Northwest to Pennsylvania and Florida.

The last confirmed jaguar in Texas was shot by rabbit hunter Richard Cuevas in 1948, 3 mi (4.8 km) southeast of Kingsville, Texas.

By the late 1960s, jaguars were thought to have been extirpated from the United States. A female was shot by a hunter in Arizona's White Mountains in 1963. Arizona outlawed jaguar hunting in 1969, but by then it was too late; no females remained, and over the next 25 years only two males were found (and killed) in Arizona. Then in 1996, Warner Glenn, a rancher and hunting guide from Douglas, Arizona, came across a jaguar in the Peloncillo Mountains and became a researcher on jaguars, placing webcams which recorded four more Arizona jaguars. No jaguars sighted in Arizona in the last 15 years had been seen since 2006. Then, in 2009, a male jaguar named Macho B died shortly after being radio-collared by Arizona Game and Fish Department (AGFD) officials in 2009. In the Macho B incident, a former AGFD subcontractor pleaded guilty to violating the Endangered Species Act for trapping the cat and a Game and Fish employee was fired for lying to federal investigators. In 2011, a male jaguar weighing  was photographed near Cochise in southern Arizona by a hunter after being treed by his dogs; the animal left the scene unharmed. A second 2011 sighting of an Arizona jaguar was reported by a Homeland Security border pilot in June 2011, and conservation researchers sighted two jaguars within  of the border between Mexico and the United States in 2010.

In September 2012, a jaguar was photographed in the Santa Rita Mountains of Arizona, the second such sighting in this region in two years. This jaguar has been photographed numerous times over the past nine months through June 2013. El Jefe is the fourth jaguar sighted in the Madrean Sky Islands in southern Arizona and New Mexico over the last 20 years.

On 16 November 2016, a jaguar was spotted in the Dos Cabezas Mountains of Arizona,  from the Mexican border, the northernmost confirmed report of a jaguar in many decades. It is the seventh jaguar to be confirmed in the Southwest since 1996. On 1 December 2016, another male jaguar was photographed on Fort Huachuca also in Arizona. The only picture obtained allowed experts to determine this is a different individual, but it does not reveal its gender; it can be assumed to be male based on all prior observations.

Conservation 
Legal action by the Center for Biological Diversity led to federal listing of the cat on the Endangered Species List in 1997. However, on January 7, 2008, George W. Bush appointee H. Dale Hall, Director of the United States Fish and Wildlife Service (USFWS), signed a recommendation to abandon jaguar recovery as a federal goal under the Endangered Species Act. Critics, including the Center of Biological Diversity and New Mexico Department of Game and Fish, were concerned the jaguar was being sacrificed for the government's new border fence, which is to be built along many of the cat's typical crossings between the United States and Mexico.

In 2010, however, the Obama Administration reversed the policy of the Bush Administration, and pledged to protect "critical habitat" and draft a recovery plan for the species. The USFWS was ultimately ordered by the court to develop a jaguar recovery plan and designate critical habitat for the cats. On 20 August 2012, the USFWS proposed setting aside 838,232 acres in Arizona and New Mexico — an area larger than Rhode Island — as critical jaguar habitat. On 4 March 2014 Federal wildlife officials set aside nearly 1,200 square miles along the U.S.-Mexico border as habitat essential for the conservation of the jaguar. The reservation includes parts of Pima, Santa Cruz and Cochise counties in Arizona and Hidalgo County in New Mexico. In September 2015, El Jefe was photographed via camera trap and analysis of his spots confirms that he has been in southeastern Arizona ( south of Tucson) since 2011. Jaguars have been present in this region every year since 1997. El Jefe and other males may have originated from a breeding population in Sonora, Mexico,  to the south of Tucson.

Northern Jaguar Project 
The Northern Jaguar Project is a conservation effort on behalf of the jaguar that is headed by an Arizona-based organization of the same name, in conjunction with Mexico's Naturalia. It is focused on protecting the jaguars living near the border between the United States and Mexico. The core of the project is the Northern Jaguar Reserve. In 2008 it was expanded to more than double its size when Rancho Zetasora was acquired. Both ranches are remote, difficult to access, and relatively untouched, making them perfect habitat, not just for jaguars, but for many other species as well. The Northern Jaguar Project is the "northernmost location where jaguars, mountain lions, bobcats, and ocelots are all found in the same vicinity", and the park also features a variety of floral habitats as well.

The project is also focused on efforts to create a stable jaguar population in Northwestern Mexico. However, its long term aspirations include a return of the jaguar to the Southwestern United States. The potential for such a reintroduction is deemed high, since as much as 30% of Arizona alone is considered to be a suitable habitat for the jaguar.

Possible reintroduction
A 2021 article by several experts in the Wildlife Conservation Society found that there exists substantial areas in both Arizona and New Mexico for jaguars. It also argues that a reintroduction of the cat is not only possible through the cooperation of local residents, conservationists, and wildlife experts, but also could cause a trophic cascade in the local ecosystems, as well as cause a significant increase in ecotourism, similarly to what happened during wolf reintroduction in Yellowstone.

Threats 
San Bernardino National Wildlife Refuge is close to the proposed border barrier, and since the proposed project would cut through a migration corridor for the jaguar between Mexico and the USA, it may interfere with the migration of Mexican jaguars to the USA, not withstanding other animals.

Gallery

Cultural significance 

 The jaguar is prominent in Mesoamerican culture. For instance, in the days of the Maya civilization, a king would sit upon a cushion made of jaguar skin, during coronation, and a number of their deities were based on it. The werejaguar was a motif and supernatural entity for Olmecs. The Aztecs had an elite group of warriors known as ocēlōmeh (plural for ocēlōtl, that is "jaguar warrior").
 In contemporary culture, the jaguar features as sports team mascot, such as the names of the South Alabama Jaguars and Jacksonville Jaguars. A red jaguar was adopted as the first official mascot for the 1968 Olympics in Mexico City.

See also 
 Panthera hybrid
 Panthera gombaszoegensis
 Panthera onca augusta
 Panthera onca mesembrina
 Paseo del Jaguar
 Felidae
 South American jaguar
 Jaguar vs lion vs tiger
 Animal-baiting

References

External links 
 North American jaguar (Modern) (YouTube)
 '63 jaguar killing echoes today in habitat debate (2013)
 Morgan 2015

Jaguars
Pleistocene mammals of North America
Carnivorans of Central America
Mammals of Mexico
Mammals of the United States